John Neil Henderson (1871 – 30 August 1930) was a Scottish professional footballer who played in the Scottish Football League for Celtic and in the Football League in England for Lincoln City, Leicester Fosse and Small Heath.

Biography

Henderson was born in Dumfries. He began his football career with the 5th Kirkcudbright Rifle Volunteers before joining Celtic in 1895, where he made his debut in the Scottish Football League on 12 December 1896 as Celtic beat Clyde 4–1. He moved on to Victoria United of Aberdeen in May 1897, and a year later tried his luck in England with Lincoln City of the Second Division, making his Football League debut on 1 September 1898 in a 1–0 win at home to Barnsley. After scoring 10 goals in 82 appearances in all competitions (9 in 76 in the league), Henderson joined Leicester Fosse in December 1900, but stayed only three months before moving on to Small Heath. The club had hoped his arrival would strengthen their push for promotion, but he played only four times before returning home. Henderson played out his career in Scottish football, apart from a short spell with Carlisle United in the Lancashire Combination, continuing until at least his late thirties.

Henderson died in Maxwelltown, Dumfries, in 1930 aged about 59.

References

1871 births
1930 deaths
Scottish footballers
Association football inside forwards
Celtic F.C. players
Lincoln City F.C. players
Leicester City F.C. players
Birmingham City F.C. players
Carlisle United F.C. players
Scottish Football League players
English Football League players
Date of birth missing
Footballers from Dumfries